Northcote is a New Zealand parliamentary electorate, returning one member of parliament to the New Zealand House of Representatives. Currently, the Member for Northcote is Shanan Halbert of the Labour Party, who won the seat at the 2020 election.

Population centres
Northcote is based around the suburbs of Auckland's North Shore that are closest to the northern end of the Auckland Harbour Bridge. In addition to the eponymous Northcote, there are Birkenhead, Birkdale, Beach Haven and the southern end of Glenfield. It was created ahead of the change to mixed-member proportional (MMP) voting in 1996 by merging the seat of Birkenhead with most of the old Glenfield electorate.

Northcote continues the electoral habits of its predecessor seats; Birkenhead was a reasonably safe seat for the National Party, supplying it with Jim McLay, who led the party from 1984 to 1986. In 1987, the seat was won by Labour, before swinging back into the blue column when Labour's fortunes thinned out at the 1990 election. Glenfield also followed this boom and bust model, being held by Labour Party MP Judy Keall through the duration of the fourth Labour government before the National Party landslide in 1990 claimed Keall as one of its victims.

Members

The first member for Northcote was Ian Revell from the National Party, who would rise to become the Deputy Speaker. Revell was caught up in a scandal for misuse of official letterhead and was defeated by Labour's Ann Hartley in 1999 New Zealand general election. In the  Coleman was re-elected in Northcote with a majority of 9,360 votes. On 22 March 2018, Coleman announced he would resign within weeks, triggering the 2018 Northcote by-election.

Members for Northcote
Key

List members
Members of Parliament elected from party lists in elections where that person also unsuccessfully contested the Northcote electorate. Unless otherwise stated, all members’ terms began and ended at general elections.

Election results

2020 election

2018 by-election

2017 election

2014 election

2011 election

Electorate (as at 26 November 2011): 45,675

2008 election

2005 election

2002 election

1999 election

1996 election

Table footnotes

References

External links
Northcote electorate profile, New Zealand Parliament

New Zealand electorates in the Auckland Region
Politics of the Auckland Region
1996 establishments in New Zealand